Catie Rosemurgy is an American poet who has authored of two collections of poetry, My Favorite Apocalypse and The Stranger Manual. Both collections are published by Graywolf Press.  Her work has also appeared in publications such as Boston Review, The American Poetry Review, and The Gettysburg Review. Rosemurgy grew up in the Upper Peninsula of Michigan but now resides in Philadelphia.

Education & Honors 
Rosemurgy is the recipient of a Rona Jaffe Foundation Writers' Award, a National Endowment for the Arts Fellowship, and a Pew Fellowship in the Arts. Rosemurgy received her MFA in Poetry from the University of Alabama.

Teaching 
Rosemurgy is a professor at The College of New Jersey (TCNJ) where she teaches courses in creative writing, poetry, and contemporary literature. Rosemurgy is also the coordinator of the Creative Writing minor.

References

External links 
 Dodd, Emily. "Discovering Gold: Spotlight on Professor Catie Rosemurgy". TCNJ Magazine. 26 November 2012.  
 "Poet Biographies: Catie Rosemurgy". The Poetry Foundation.

Living people
University of Alabama alumni
The College of New Jersey faculty
American women poets
Rona Jaffe Foundation Writers' Award winners
Year of birth missing (living people)
American women academics
21st-century American women